Pothanikkad  or Pothanicad is a village in Ernakulam district in the Indian state of Kerala.
It's also the first village to achieve 96.00% literacy in India. However, In 2011, literacy rate of Mallappally village was 96.92 % compared to 94.00 % of Kerala, the highest in India. In Mallappally Male literacy stands at 96.85 % while female literacy rate was 96.99 %.
 Back to the village, the name Pothanikkad derives from the Malayalam words poth, meaning buffalo, anaa, meaning elephant, and kaddu, meaning forest, as it was originally a forest with wild buffalos and elephants. Now, this small village has developed into one of the most educated and culturally advanced villages in Kerala. St. Mary's High School is the oldest high school in Pothanicad, where very prominent people in the society and many local politicians have been educated. St. John's Higher Secondary  school Pulinthanam is a pioneering educational institution in the village. A government Lower Primary school and two other private Senior Secondary High schools, following CBSE curriculum, also provides better educational opportunities for the young community.

Pothanikkad is 16 km away from Thommankuthu Water Falls, the nearest tourist location and approximately 22 km from well known Thattekad Bird Sanctuary near Kothamangalam. It is also known for churches like Pothanicad St. Mary's Jacobite Syrian Church, Ummanikkunnu St. Mary's Orthodox Syrian Church and St Xavier's Catholic Church. The village is also known for the festival of ‘ilaneerattam’ hosted by the Thrikkeppadi Sri Mahadev Temple.

Prominent Indian industrialist C J George hails from Pothanikkad.

Demographics
 India census, Pothanikkad had a population of 19,309 with 9,620 males and 9,689 females.

References

Villages in Ernakulam district